Masaki Yamada may refer to:

, Japanese musician
, Japanese writer